Marc Treanor (19 June 1963 – 2 July 2020) was a sand artist living in Dinas, Pembrokeshire. He was notable for creating intricate patterns on beaches in Cornwall and later in Pembrokeshire, Wales. Treanor was well known in the county.

Methodology 
Treanor produced his sand murals by sketching designs on paper before using a rake to recreate the design on a beach. The work would then remain on the beach until washed away by the tide. As a result of their innately fleeting nature and circular forms, Treanor's sand murals have been compared to crop circles.

Personal life
Marc had a son and a daughter and had begun doing sand art to entertain them at the beach. This turned in to a career once he moved to Wales, working with a variety of organisations and charities  throughout Wales.

References 

21st-century British artists
Sand art
1963 births
2020 deaths